The Adelaide Plains Football League (APFL) is an Australian rules football competition based in the Adelaide Plains region immediately north of Adelaide, South Australia. It is an affiliated member of the South Australian National Football League.

History 
Grace Plains was possibly the first club formed in the District in 1904. Football was certainly played in the other towns of Mallala, Dublin and Two Wells at that time with those clubs all officially forming in 1908. When Virginia was formed in 1909, moves were being made to form an association from a group of clubs that had played an unofficial competition in 1908.

A meeting held in Dublin on 4 May 1909, resulted in the formation of the Adelaide Plains Football Association. Delegates were present from Mallala, Virginia, Two Wells, Windsor, Lower Light and Dublin. Officers elected were, patron Mr Coombe, president Mr George Cheney and secretary Mr Andrew Driscoll. At a second meeting the colours were chosen as double blue.

Dublin had a comfortable victory over Two Wells in the first match of the new association 9.14 (68) to 0.2 (2). Dublin had gone to a lot of trouble to ensure their facilities were adequate for their opening match of the season. In the preceding months they had built dressing rooms, a pavilion and had even erected new goal posts.

Wasleys Football Club created a record in 1927 when they became the first Adelaide Plains club to complete a season without losing a match. Hamley Bridge applied to join the association in 1930 but their application was rejected because of the poor condition of the roads over which visiting teams would have to travel to arrive at Hamley Bridge.

During a history of just over 100 years, the Adelaide Plains association has stood tall, outlasting many nearby associations. The Wooroora, Wakefield, North Western, Lower North and Gilbert associations have all fallen by the wayside with their member clubs or their incarnations filtering through to become the Adelaide Plains of today.

(From South Australian Country Football Digest - Peter Lines)

Grounds 
 Ralli Park Showgrounds
 Balaklava  
 Hamley Bridge Sporting Oval, Hamley Bridge
 Hummocks-Watchman Eagles Football Club, Port Wakefield
 Lochiel Oval, Lochiel
 Mallala Football Club, Mallala
 Two Wells Football Club, Two Wells
 United Football Club, Long Plains
 Virginia Recreation Park, Virginia
 Angle Vale Community Sports Centre, Angle Vale

2020 statistics 
 A Grade Premiers
 Mallala 17.7 (109) defeated Virginia  10.9 (69)
Reserves Premiers
 Two Wells 18.9 (117) defeated Virginia 5.8 (38)
 Senior Colts Premiers (U17)
 Mallala 6.13 (49) defeated Bute 3.7 (25)
Junior Colts Premiers (U14)
 Two Wells 6.5 (41) defeated  Bute 4.6 (30)
Plains Producer Medallist
 Luke Barnett (Two Wells)
Reserves Medallist
 James Rundle (United)
Senior Colts Medallist
 Bailey Arthur (Mallala)
 Junior Colts Medallist
Luke Barnett (Two Wells)
A Grade Leading Goalkicker
 Brendon Niklaus, Virginia (50)
Reserves Leading Goalkicker
Justin Platt, Two Wells (28)
Senior Colts Leading Goalkicker
 Riley Evans, Mallala (25)
 Junior Colts Leading Goalkicker
 Alex Daly, Two Wells (23)

Current Clubs 

Notes

Premierships 
 Reserves was formed in 1958
 Senior Colts was formed in 1966. It was then called colts and under 15. In 1976 the name changed to Under 16s. Today it is Under 17s
 Junior Colts was formed in 1970. It was then called minis. In 1976 the name changed to under 13s. Today it is Under 14s.

No football was played between 1916 and 1918 due to World War I

No Football was played between 1941 and 1944 due to World War II

Mail Medals 
54 Mail Medals were awarded in Adelaide Plains from 1933 to 1940 and 1949 to 1988. There were tied results in 1953, 1963, 1973, 1977 and 1987. The Mail Medal was augmented in 1987 with the Plains Producer Medal, which has been donated by the Balaklava Weekly Newspaper. The Plains Producer Medal has adapted the same voting system. Both medals were given in 1987/88. Two Wells midfielder Cecil Rowe won the first Medal from Dublin’s Alan Webb. This Medal was one of only 16 given throughout the state.

2009 Ladder

2010 Ladder

2011 Ladder

2012 Ladder

2013 Ladder

2014 Ladder

Bibliography
 Encyclopedia of South Australian country football clubs compiled by Peter Lines. 
 South Australian country football digest by Peter Lines

References

External links
 

Australian rules football competitions in South Australia
South Australian National Football League